Edward Cowell (22 March 1848 — 17 November 1885) was an English first-class cricketer.

Cowell was born at Cambridge in March 1848. He played first-class cricket for Cambridgeshire in 1867, making two appearances against Nottinghamshire and one appearance against Yorkshire. A right-arm roundarm fast bowler, he took 4 wickets with best figures of 3 for 11. As a batsman, he scored 37 runs with a highest score of 13. It was noted by Fred Lillywhite that Cowell was a strong fielder at mid-on. In the same year that he played for Cambridgeshire, he was engaged by Trinity College at their cricket ground in Cambridge and was later engaged by Warwickshire in 1874 at their County Ground in Warwick. Cowell died at Cambridge in November 1885.

References

External links

1848 births
1885 deaths
Cricketers from Cambridgeshire
Sportspeople from Cambridge
English cricketers
Cambridge Town Club cricketers